Megachile aurorea is a species of bee in the family Megachilidae. It was described by Friese in 1917.

References

Aurorea
Insects described in 1917